Joshua Charnley (born 26 June 1991) is an English international professional rugby league footballer who plays on the  for the Leigh Leopards in the Super League.

He previously played for the Warrington Wolves and Wigan Warriors, with whom he won the 2013 and 2016 Super League Grand Finals, and was on loan from Wigan at Hull Kingston Rovers in the Super League. He has also played for the England Knights at international level.

Charnley also played rugby union for the Sale Sharks in the Aviva Premiership.

Background
Charnley was born in Chorley, Lancashire, England on 26 June 1991.

He originally started playing for Chorley Panthers and then local amateurs Wigan St Patricks leading to Super League's Wigan Warriors.

Professional playing career
Charnley made numerous appearances for the Under 20s in 2010 before joining Blackpool Panthers on dual registration and then Hull Kingston Rovers on loan. He was a player around the fringes of a first team opportunity at Wigan before the possibility came to join Hull Kingston Rovers for a month. Injuries meant he was given the chance to play first team rugby by Hull KR coach Justin Morgan, making his Super League début. Charnley showed great promise on his début for Hull KR against Leeds in 2010 and picked up the club man of the match award. He scored five tries in five appearances which included a hat-trick in Hull KR's home win over Castleford, and the opening try in the derby clash with Hull FC.

Wigan Warriors
Charnley made his first team début for Wigan at Craven Park against Hull Kingston Rovers in August where he scored a try off the bench.

He played on the wing in the 2011 Challenge Cup Final victory over the Leeds side at Wembley Stadium. Charnley scored the first try, and broke a bone in his hand in his side's victory over Leeds.

Charnley made his International début for the England Knights in a friendly International against France in 2011. He scored 2 tries and kicked four goals on his début. He went on to make another Knights appearance against Cumbria one week later.

In the 2012 Super League season he scored 31 tries to help Wigan to the League Leaders' Shield. This put Charnley in third place in the all-time top try scorers in a regular season in the summer era as only Lesley Vainikolo (36 tries) and Danny McGuire (35 tries), both in 2004, have scored more tries in a Super League regular season. Charnley made his senior International début for England against Wales in the 2012 Autumn International Series. Charnley scored four tries in his first appearance for England.

Charnley then went onto an even better 2013 season helping Wigan to the double (Challenge Cup winners and Super League champions) scoring a record-breaking 43 tries ranking him first. He played in the 2013 Challenge Cup Final victory over Hull F.C. at Wembley Stadium. He played in the 2013 Super League Grand Final victory over the Warrington Wolves at Old Trafford.

He represented England in the 2013 Rugby League World Cup.

Although the game ended in a 36–14 defeat for Wigan, Charnley scored two tries in the 2014 World Club Challenge against NRL champions the Sydney Roosters. On 18 June 2014, he scored five tries in a 48–4 victory over Widnes. Despite missing two months of action due to a knee injury, Charnley still scored at a rate of over a try a game with 23 tries in 21 games in the 2014 season.

He played in the 2014 Super League Grand Final defeat by St. Helens at Old Trafford.
He represented England at the 2014 Four Nations.  During the 2016 season, it was announced that Charnley would switch codes to join Sale Sharks at the end of the 2016 Super League season. Charnley signed off in style as he scored the winning try in the 2016 Super League Grand Final against Warrington, chasing and touching down a beautifully weighted kick from Dan Sarginson at Old Trafford.

Rugby Union
On 30 March 2016, Charnley made the cross-code switch to Rugby Union with Manchester-based Sale Sharks, who compete in the Aviva Premiership, for the 2016–17 season. Charnley was not able to repeat his scoring success in Rugby Union, bagging four tries in 32 games. Charnley then returned to Rugby League for the 2018 summer season. His last game in Rugby Union was against London Irish in February 2018.

Warrington Wolves
Charnley returned to rugby league for the 2018 season with Super League club, Warrington Wolves.

He played in the 2018 Challenge Cup Final defeat by the Catalans Dragons at Wembley Stadium.

He played in the 2018 Super League Grand Final defeat by the Wigan Warriors at Old Trafford.

He played in the 2019 Challenge Cup Final victory over St. Helens at Wembley Stadium.

Leigh
On 25 June 2022, Charnley signed an initial loan deal with Championship side Leigh with a permanent contract starting in 2023.  On 10 July 2022, Charnley made his debut for Leigh, scoring a try during a 66–0 victory over Workington Town.
On 28 August 2022, Charnley scored two tries for Leigh in a 42–4 victory over Widnes.
In round 3 of the 2023 Super League season, Charnley scored two tries including the winner as Leigh earned their first win back in the top flight defeating Hull Kingston Rovers 30-25.

Honours
Grand Final: 3
2010, 2013, 2016

League Leaders' Shield: 22010, 2012Challenge Cup: 32011, 2013, 2019Super League Top Try Scorer: 2'
2012 (31 tries), 2013 (33 tries)

References

External links
Warrington Wolves profile
SL profile

1991 births
Living people
Blackpool Panthers players
England Knights national rugby league team players
England national rugby league team players
English rugby league players
English rugby union players
Hull Kingston Rovers players
Leigh Leopards players
Rugby league centres
Rugby league players from Lancashire
Rugby league wingers
Rugby union players from Chorley
Sale Sharks players
Warrington Wolves players
Wigan St Patricks players
Wigan Warriors players